Hobbie may refer to:

Places
 Hobbie Ridge, a ridge that projects from the middle of the head of Meander Glacier

People
 Glen Hobbie (1936–2013), American professional baseball player
 Holly Hobbie (born 1944), American writer, watercolorist, and illustrator
 Holly Hobbie, fictional eponymous character featured in such books as Holly Hobbie and Friends: Surprise Party and Holly Hobbie and Friends: Christmas Wishes
 Sarah Hobbie, American ecologist
 Selah R. Hobbie (1797–1854), U.S. Representative from New York

Other uses
 Hobbie Accessible, American automobile manufactured in Hampton, Iowa from 1908 until 1909

See also

 
 
 Hobby (disambiguation)
 Hobbe (disambiguation)
 Hobbes (disambiguation)